Quintus Marcius Rex was a name used by men of the gens Marcia in Ancient Rome. They belonged to the Marcii Reges, a family who were the relatives of Julius Caesar through his grandmother Marcia.

 Quintus Marcius Rex, tribune of the plebs in 196 BC, proposed to the people to make peace with Philip V of Macedon.
 Quintus Marcius Rex, praetor in 144 BC, famously known for the Aqua Marcia aqueduct which he constructed and was named after him.
 Quintus Marcius Rex, grandfather of the consul in 118 BC.
 Quintus Marcius Q. f. Rex, father of the consul in 118 BC and paternal great-grandfather of Julius Caesar, possibly identified with the praetor in 144 BC.
 Quintus Marcius Q. f. Q. n. Rex, consul in 118 BC, paternal great-uncle of Julius Caesar.
 (Quintus) Marcius (Q. f. Q. n.) Rex, the son of the consul in 118 BC and, due to the Roman naming conventions, possibly the father of the consul in 68 BC. According to Smith, the consul in 118 BC had an only son who died young (possibly, but not necessarily, interpreted as leaving no children of his own), and the consul in 68 BC was possibly a grandson of the consul in 118 BC, which could have suggested a) either this Marcius died leaving a son being the consul in 68 BC; or b) less likely— since Roman cousins in the same family (in this case, the Marcii Reges) rarely married each other— the consul in 68 BC was a nephew through one of this Marcius' sisters and this sister probably married another Quintus Marcius Rex (the consul in 68 BC had the filiation Quinti filius, abb. Q. f.); or c) more likely, the consul in 68 BC was adopted by his maternal uncle.
 Quintus Marcius Q. f. (Q. n.) Rex, consul in 68 BC, grandson of the consul in 118 BC and a second cousin of Julius Caesar, also a brother-in-law of Publius Clodius Pulcher.

References

Sources 
Smith, William (1842). Dictionary of Greek and Roman Biography and Mythology.

Quintus
Ancient Roman prosopographical lists